Tonna canaliculata is a species of large sea snail, a marine gastropod mollusk in the family Tonnidae, the tun shells.

Description
This type of sea snail is distinguished from many others by the fact that its fleshy foot is so much larger than its shell. As with land snails, this gastropod ("stomach-footed") secretes mucous which helps it glide across the bottom. Although I have often heard this type of snail labeled as a "bubble shell" by divers, in fact this animal is a member of the subclass Prosobranchia (snails) as compared to the subclass to which bubble shells belong, Opisthobranchia (bubble shells, sea hares, nudibranchs and others). A third subclass of class Gastropoda is Pulmonata (land snails and land slugs).

Its shell length varies between 30 mm and 145 mm., with its long siphon (for respiration) and tentacles (with eyes at their base) clearly visible. Tuns are known for their thin shells. They are night predators and are usually seen in sandy areas, feeding on bivalve molluscs (clams, oysters, mussels and scallops) and sea cucumbers.

Distribution
This marine species occurs in the Indo-Pacific.

References

External links
 Gastropods.com: Tonna (Canaliculata complex) canaliculata

Tonnidae
Gastropods described in 1758
Taxa named by Carl Linnaeus